Cochylimorpha maleropa is a species of moth of the family Tortricidae. It is found in China (Shaanxi, Yunnan).

References

Moths described in 1937
Cochylimorpha
Moths of Asia